The 1954 Michigan State Normal Hurons football team represented Michigan State Normal College (renamed Eastern Michigan College in 1956 and Eastern Michigan University in 1959) in the Interstate Intercollegiate Athletic Conference (IIAC) during the 1954 college football season. In their third season under head coach Fred Trosko, the Hurons compiled an 8–1 record (5–1 against IIAC opponents), tied with Central Michigan for the IIAC championship, and outscored their opponents, 210 to 67. Nicholas Manych was the team captain. The Hurons lost to Central Michigan by a 28 to 7 score in the final game of the season, resulting in the two teams sharing the conference championship. Quarterback Bob Middlekauff led the team with 934 yards of total offense. Virgil Windom led the team with 530 rushing yards and in scoring with 11 touchdowns and 66 points. Middlekauf was also named MVP of the IIAC.

Schedule

References

Michigan State Normal
Eastern Michigan Eagles football seasons
Interstate Intercollegiate Athletic Conference football champion seasons
Michigan State Normal Hurons football